Jimmy Tattersall was the defending champion, but lost to Premjit Lall in the semifinals.

Butch Buchholz defeated Lall in the final, 6–1, 6–3 to win the boys' singles tennis title at the 1958 Wimbledon Championships.

Draw

Finals

Top half

Bottom half

References

External links

Boys' Singles
Wimbledon Championship by year – Boys' singles